Route nationale 4  (RN4) is a primary highway in Madagascar. The route runs from the capital city of Antananarivo to Mahajanga, a city on the north-east coast of the Madagascar. It covers a distance of 570 km.

Selected locations on route (from south to north)
Antananarivo
Ampanotokana (junction to Morarano/Miantso by the  RNT 36)
Andranovelona (water power plant)
Ankazobe
Ankazosary
Andranofeno
Manerinerina 
Ankarambe
Mahatsinjo
Andrioa
Antanimbary
Andranobevava
Beanana
Maevatanana
Andramy
Bridge over Betsiboka River
Ambalanjanakomby
Maromalandy
Andranomamy
Mahajamba River - bridge
Ambondromamy - (junction with RN 6)
Ankarafantsika National Park National Park
Mahajanga

See also
List of roads in Madagascar
Transport in Madagascar

References 

Roads in Madagascar
 Roads in Analamanga
 Roads in Boeny
 Roads in Betsiboka